Buranovka is a rural locality (a settlement) in Mormyshansky Selsoviet, Romanovsky District, Altai Krai, Russia. The population was 241 as of 2013. There are 3 streets.

Geography 
Buranovka is located 33 km southwest of Romanovo (the district's administrative centre) by road. Ilyinsky is the nearest rural locality.

References 

Rural localities in Romanovsky District, Altai Krai